Kabaddi at the 2016 South Asian Games were held in Guwahati, India from 10 to 15 February 2016.

Medalists

Medal table

References

External links
Official website

2016 South Asian Games
Events at the 2016 South Asian Games
Kabaddi at the South Asian Games